Hendrick van Cleve may refer to:

Hendrick van Cleve I (active in Antwerp 1489-1519), the teacher of Jan Sanders van Hemessen
Hendrick van Cleve III (ca. 1525-1589), painter of landscapes, portraits and architecture

Cleve